Eweida v United Kingdom  is a UK labour law decision of the European Court of Human Rights, concerning the duty of the government of the United Kingdom to protect the religious rights of individuals under the European Convention on Human Rights. The European Court found that the British government had failed to protect the complainant's right to manifest her religion, in breach of Article 9 of the European Convention.  For failing to protect her rights, the British government was found liable to pay non-pecuniary damages of €2,000, along with a costs award of €30,000.

The case arose from a dispute between British Airways (BA) and one of its employees, Nadia Eweida, over its uniform policy, which required that religious jewellery had to be worn out of sight, under one's clothing.  Eweida visibly wore a necklace with a religious symbol, a small cross, while working.  British Airways placed her on unpaid leave for doing so.  The British courts ruled in favour of British Airways and against Eweida under the Human Rights Act 1998, an Act of the British Parliament which implements the European Convention in British law.  Eweida then brought a complaint under the European Convention against the Government of the United Kingdom, alleging that the decisions of the British courts amounted to a failure by the United Kingdom to protect her religious rights.

The case was widely reported in the British media. Some individuals argued that British Airways' policy showed anti-Christian prejudice. Other groups argued that it showed favouritism towards people of faith.

Facts
In October 2006, Nadia Eweida, a Christian employee of British Airways, was asked to cover up a cross necklace which depicted a Christian cross, and was placed on unpaid leave when she refused either to do so or to accept a position where she did not have to cover it up. She was wearing the necklace on the outside of her uniform, contravening BA's uniform policy for jewellery. Eweida planned to sue the airline for religious discrimination. Some Christian groups accused British Airways of double standards, as Sikh and Muslim employees are not prevented from wearing religious garments at work, since these are impractical to cover up.  Although the wearing of garments is a requirement in some faiths, in this case, British Airways believes that wearing a cross is not necessary in Christianity, in general.

Eweida lost an initial appeal to her employers on 20 November, but publicly stated she would continue to dispute BA's policy, and that she wished to wear the cross to manifest her religion: the BBC quoted her as saying, "It is important to wear it to express my faith so that other people will know that Jesus loves them."

The National Secular Society argued it was sensible for staff handling baggage to be prohibited from wearing jewellery over their uniforms, said that Eweida was trying to evangelise in the workplace and that BA should have the right to insist that its uniform is neutral.

BA, having had the same policy with regard to jewellery being worn with the uniform for a long time, with which other staff were comfortable, responded to pressure and  announced on 25 November a review of its uniform policy which could allow the wearing of a lapel badge.  The Archbishop of Canterbury disclosed that the issue had been raised with the Church Commissioners, who look after Anglicans' financial interests. The following day Eweida declared that this compromise was unacceptable to her.

On 28 November, the Prime Minister, Tony Blair, publicly stated that in his view the issue was not worth BA fighting and that it would be best for the airline "just to do the sensible thing": i.e. allow the cross to be worn.

On 19 January 2007, BA announced that they would in future allow employees to wear a symbol of faith "openly" on a lapel pin, "with some flexibility ... to wear a symbol of faith on a chain".

Judgments of the British Tribunals and Court of Appeal

Employment Tribunal
Although BA changed its policy, it refused to pay Eweida for the period of her suspension. Eweida opted to pursue her case against BA at an employment tribunal, citing the original BA ruling as a form of discrimination against Christians. On 8 January 2008, after rejecting an out of court settlement offer reported at £8,500, Eweida lost her case. It was rejected on the grounds that she had breached the firm's regulations without good cause. The tribunal commented that it was "not a tribunal of faith".  The tribunal's report highlighted several other issues regarding Eweida's conduct at BA, including refusing to work on Christmas Day and telling a gay colleague that he could still be "redeemed".

Employment Appeal Tribunal
In the Employment Appeal Tribunal, Elias J refused Ms Eweida's appeal.

Court of Appeal
Eweida first appealed to the Court of Appeal for a costs capping order, which was shortly refused. She then appealed on substantive grounds, which also failed in February, 2010. Sedley LJ upheld the judgment of the EAT.

In October 2010, after the Supreme Court refused to hear her case, Ms. Eweida announced her intention to seek redress in the European Court of Human Rights in Strasbourg.

European Court of Human Rights
The European Court of Human Rights heard Ms. Eweida's case in September 2012, in combination with three other cases. This was against the UK government for failing to provide domestic law to protect the claimed rights, rather than against BA. In January 2013, the court found that her rights had been violated under Article 9 of the European Convention on Human Rights and awarded her damages of €2,000 plus costs of €30,000. They ruled this as they said British Airways had not reached a fair balance between Eweida's religious beliefs and the company's desire to have a particular corporate image.

The court said the following, in weighing up the merits of the case.

Significance
This case highlighted some issues around the inadequacy of UK employment equality law in dealing with religion cases. There has been a suggestion from lawyers at Lewis Silkin LLP that perhaps a better approach might be for employers to have a duty to make adjustments to accommodate religion (as currently exists in the US and Canada).

See also

UK labour law
UK employment discrimination law
Goldman v. Weinberger

Notes

References
E McGaughey, A Casebook on Labour Law (Hart 2019) ch 13, 598

External links
British Airways

Christianity-related controversies
History of Christianity in the United Kingdom
Secularism in the United Kingdom
British Airways litigation
Court of Appeal (England and Wales) cases
European Court of Human Rights cases involving the United Kingdom
Article 9 of the European Convention on Human Rights
2010 in case law
2010 in British law
2010 in religion
British uniforms